Grassroots is the second album by 311, released on July 12, 1994. The album was intentionally recorded to have a "muddy" tone, and was recorded in a small house in Van Nuys where all of the band members lived together. This album also contains the track "Applied Science", which is a staple in 311's live show and has included a full-band drum solo since 2000. P-Nut records with a five-string Warwick bass for the first time here as well. The album was certified Gold in 1999 by the RIAA, having sold over 500,000 copies.

A special vinyl edition of the record was pressed for Black Friday in 2011 at United Record Pressing in Nashville, TN.

Critical reception

Sandra Schulman of the South Florida Sun Sentinel chastised Grassroots for resembling "Beastie Boys meets the Spin Doctors", writing that while musical fusion is a "fine" template to work from, the album is unsuccessful for reminding them of the musical styles of other musicians, rather than presenting "something new to groove on". They also added that while 311 may have "a lot to say", "none of it is getting across" behind the group's funk bass backdrops, speedy tempos and "thick as thieves" lyrics. By contrast, J.D. Considine of the Tuscon Citizen wrote that while 311 are stylistically similar to the Beastie Boys and Red Hot Chili Peppers, there is "nothing secondhand" about the music on Grassroots, partly for the band's "more natural fusion of rock and rhyme" than the aforementioned groups in which sung and rapped parts "coexist in their own songs without seeming crowded together", and partly for the group's jazzy swing, as exemplified on songs like "8:16 a.m." He further praised the band for being energetic without "getting mirred in musical extremes".

Rodo Pocowatchit of The Wichita Eagle also drew comparisons to the Beastie Boys and Chili Peppers, as well as "a dash of Faith No More", but noted that the further incorporation of reggae, funk and hip hop flavours and "biting, mile-a-minute lyrics" made Grassroots feel "as raw as any urban underground from-the-gut record", and praised the group's energy and tone. Retrospectively, Jacob N. Lunders of AllMusic selected Grassroots as an "Album Pick" and wrote that it was 311's artistic peak and one of 1994's most underrated records, adding that it "evenly balancing the band's rap-metal intensity with reggae vibrations, Grateful Dead-like jams, and hallucinogenic ambience." He recommended it to fans of the Red Chili Peppers, Rage Against the Machine and Sublime, but also noted how the album "artistically ignores corporate rock's temptations of conformity, which consequently threaten the possibility of mainstream airplay."

Track listing

Personnel
Credits adapted from album’s liner notes.

311
Nick Hexum – lead vocals, rhythm guitar, programming
Chad Sexton – drums, percussion, programming
Tim Mahoney – lead guitar
P-Nut – bass
S.A. Martinez – vocals, turntables

Production
Produced and Engineered by: Eddy Offord, 311
Drums Recorded by: Scott Ralston
Mixing: Chris Shaw
Mastering: Chris Bellman
Photography: Darin Back

Charts

Certifications

References

1994 albums
311 (band) albums
Albums produced by Eddy Offord
Capricorn Records albums
Rap metal albums
Reggae albums by American artists